António de Melo (born 30 January 1960) is a Portuguese former freestyle, backstroke and medley swimmer. He competed in six events at the 1976 Summer Olympics.

References

External links
 

1960 births
Living people
Portuguese male backstroke swimmers
Portuguese male freestyle swimmers
Portuguese male medley swimmers
Olympic swimmers of Portugal
Swimmers at the 1976 Summer Olympics
Place of birth missing (living people)